Banksia pellaeifolia is a species of shrub that is endemic to the south-west of Western Australia. It has underground stems, deeply pinnatipartite leaves with twenty to thirty lobes on each side, yellowish-brown flowers in heads of about sixty-five, and egg-shaped follicles.

Description

Taxonomy and naming
This species was first formally described in 1810 by Robert Brown who gave it the name Dryandra blechnifolia and published the description in the Transactions of the Linnean Society of London from specimens collected by Archibald Menzies near King George's Sound. The specific epithet (blechnifolia) was a reference to the fern genus Blechnum with a Latin ending meaning "-leaved".

In 2007, Austin Mast and Kevin Thiele transferred all the dryandras to the genus Banksia, but since there was already a species named Banksia blechnifolia, Mast and Thiele gave this species the name Banksia pellaeifolia. The epithet (pellaeifolia) refers to the fern genus Pellaea.

Distribution and habitat
Banksia pellaeifolia grows in kwongan and is mostly found in the Stirling Range National Park and towards Ongerup.

Ecology
An assessment of the potential impact of climate change on this species found that its range is likely to contract by between 50% and 80% by 2080, depending on the severity of the change.

Conservation status
This banksia is classed as "not threatened" by the Western Australian Government Department of Parks and Wildlife.

References

pellaeifolia
Plants described in 1810
Taxa named by Robert Brown (botanist, born 1773)